Francisco Sancet (August 24, 1907 - March 22, 1985) was a baseball coach and catcher. He served as the head baseball coach at the University of Arizona from 1950 to 1972, compiling a record of 831–275–10. He played college baseball for Phoenix College from 1926 to 1927 before transferring to Arizona where he played for coach Pop McKale from 1928 to 1929 before playing professionally.

Career
Sancet played professional baseball in minor league baseball for the Tampa Smokers and the Tucson Cowboys. He coached the Arizona Wildcats baseball team to an 831–275–10 win–loss record in 23 seasons, from 1950 through 1972.

After his death, the University of Arizona renamed their baseball field in his honor. Sancet was inducted into the Pima County Sports Hall of Fame in 1991. He was inducted into the National College Baseball Hall of Fame in 2012.

References

External links

1907 births
1985 deaths
Place of birth missing
Arizona Wildcats baseball coaches
Arizona Wildcats football coaches
Arizona Wildcats men's basketball coaches
Arizona Wildcats baseball players
Arizona Wildcats football players
Arizona Wildcats men's basketball players
Phoenix Bears baseball players
Tampa Smokers players
Tucson Cowboys players
National College Baseball Hall of Fame inductees